Constant Vez (23 June 1873 – 25 May 1947) was a Swiss sculptor. His work was part of the sculpture event in the art competition at the 1924 Summer Olympics.

References

1873 births
1947 deaths
19th-century Swiss sculptors
20th-century Swiss sculptors
Swiss sculptors
Olympic competitors in art competitions
Place of birth missing
20th-century Swiss male artists